Neolin (meaning the enlightened in Algonquian) was a prophet of the Lenni Lenape (also known as Delaware) from the village of Muskingum in Ohio. His dates of birth and death are unknown.

Inspired by a religious vision in 1761, Neolin proclaimed that Native Americans needed to reject the goods and lifestyles of the European settlers and return to a more traditional lifestyle, specifically rejecting alcohol, materialism, and polygamy. Neolin's most famous follower was Pontiac.

Biography 

In 1761 Neolin went through a period of fasting, incantation and dreaming, during which he claimed to have been visited by the Master of Life (Keesh-she'-la-mil'-lang-up, or "being that thought us into being"). In his vision, Neolin was called to visit the Master of Life. He prepared as if for a hunt. His journey led him along a path which eventually forked into 3 roads. Neolin sheltered at the fork as night fell, where he noticed "the three roads became all the brighter the darker it grew, a thing that surprised him to a point of fear"(Cave 271). At sunrise, Neolin set out upon the most expansive of the three roads, where he "suddenly saw a great fire coming out of the earth" (Cave 271). He returned to the crossroads and picked a second road, which again led to a great fire. Returning again to the fork, Neolin picked the third road, which led him to "what appeared to be a mountain of marvelous whiteness, and he stopped, overcome with astonishment" (Cave 272). While at the mountain he encountered a beautiful woman who explained to him that in order for him to see the Master of Life he must strip naked and cleanse himself in the nearby river. After doing that, the woman told him that "he must use only his left hand and his left foot in the ascent" (Cave 272). Neolin arrived at the top of the mountain naked and tired, and saw a village. A voice told him that he could go into the village because he was cleansed before the ascent. At the gate he was greeted by a man dressed in all white who led him to the Master of Life. The Master of Life took Neolin's hand, gave him a "hat all bordered with gold," and said, "I am He who hath created the heavens and the earth, the trees, lakes, rivers, all men, and all thou seest and hath seen upon the earth. Because I love you, ye must do what I say and love, and not do what I hate" (Cave 272). In conversation with the Master of Life, Neolin he was told that the master was displeased with his people for "addiction to the white man's alcohol, and deplored Indian polygamy, sexual promiscuity, witchcraft, and strife" (Cave 273). The greatest offense was the fact that the Indians were tolerating the Europeans in their lands. The Master promised to restore the lands with game and prosperity if the Indians were to resist "further European incursions" (Cave 273). The Master of Life told him that the path to Heaven was to reject the ways of the Europeans and to return to the traditional ways of their ancestors; particularly monogamous sexuality, to live by the bow and arrow, to dress themselves in animal skins, and to stop drinking alcohol. There is great resemblance between the religion that Neolin introduced to the Lenni Lenape and Christianity, perhaps because of the exposure to Christianity.

Hundreds of native people in the area later known as Ohio became disciples of Neolin. Neolin taught that Native Americans had been corrupted by European ways and needed to purify themselves by returning to their traditions and preparing for a holy war. "Drive them out," he declared of the settlers. A group of chiefs gained influence by adopting Neolin's ideas, and organized a confederacy of tribes. The principal figure among them was the Ottawa chief Pontiac, renowned as an orator and political leader.

In 1762, Neolin was shown a prayer by the Master of Life, to be said every morning and evening. Neolin's greatest work was the "Great Book of Writing", a chart in which he mapped the path a soul must take to get to heaven. This description of the 'path to happiness' was portrayed by Neolin on a diagram, inscribed on a deer hide. The diagram "drew a path from earth to heaven ascending to happiness"(Dowd 33). Each path was blocked by 'strokes' which represented the vices brought by the Europeans. The only way to happiness was to avoid these vices. By doing this, individuals would have to follow the narrow path in order to lead themselves to happiness. He declared that, "to help the Indian remember these teachings, Neolin advised the hearers to obtain a copy of the bible, which he offered to reproduce at the fixed rate of one buckskin or two doeskins each"

Pontiac and his allies planned a coordinated attack against the British in the spring of 1763. Neolin rejected the uprising, and called for the tribes to lay down their arms. But Pontiac's War went ahead, and proved to be one of the first in a series of Native American anti-colonial resistance movements marked by an inspirational combination of religious and political leadership.

Legacy 
		
The Trout, also called Maya-Ga-Wy, was an Ottawa prophet on the scene in the early 1800s. He was noted for having carried on the legacy of Neolin and Pontiac, advocating the return to traditional ways as a means of combating European domination. His beliefs went further, not only condemning alcohol and the fur trade with whites, but also the consumption of bread ("food of the Whites") and the wearing of hats.

Neolin's teachings, as adopted by Pontiac, affected the policy "of nearly twenty tribes from Lake Ontario to the Mississippi, including among them the Ojibwa, Ottawa, Potawatomi, Seneca, Huron, Miami, Shawnee, and Delaware." Pontiac was known to use "Neolin's message as a slogan ... to attract warriors" for the military movement on Detroit" (Dowd 35).

See also 
Pontiac (person)
Tenskwatawa
Native American temperance activists

References

External links 
 Barrett, Carole, Harvey Markowitz, and R. Kent Rasmussen, eds. American Indian Biographies. Pasadena, CA: Salem Press, 2005.

Lenape people
Religious figures of the indigenous peoples of North America
Indigenous people of Pontiac's War
1761 in North America
Native American temperance activists